The 2022 IHF Women's Youth World Championship was the ninth edition of the IHF Women's Youth World Championship, held from 30 July to 10 August 2022 in Skopje, North Macedonia under the aegis of the International Handball Federation (IHF). Originally scheduled to be held in Tbilisi, Georgia, it was moved to North Macedonia in April 2022 due to uncertainty because of the 2022 Russian invasion of Ukraine and the safety of the tournament held in Georgia.

South Korea won their first-ever title with a 31–28 win over Denmark in the final.

Bidding process
Only Georgia entered bid for hosting the tournament. The tournament was awarded to Georgia by IHF Council in its meeting held in Cairo, Egypt on 28 February 2020.

Qualification

Russia was exluded due to the 2022 Russian invasion of Ukraine.
Slovenia replaced Georgia.

Draw
The draw was held on 2 June 2022 at Basel, Switzerland.

Seeding

Preliminary round
All times are local (UTC+2).

Group A

Group B

Group C

Group D

Group E

Group F

Group G

Group H

President's Cup
Points obtained in the matches against the team from the group were taken over.

Group I

Group II

Group III

Group IV

Main round
Points obtained in the matches against the team from the group were taken over.

Group I

Group II

Group III

Group IV

Placement matches

29th place bracket

29th–32nd place semifinals

31st place game

29th place game

25th place bracket

25–28th place semifinals

27th place game

25th place game

21st place bracket

21st–24th place semifinals

23rd place game

21st place game

17th place bracket

17–20th place semifinals

19th place game

17th place game

13th place bracket

13–16th place semifinals

15th place game

13th place game

Ninth place bracket

9–12th place semifinals

Eleventh place game

Ninth place game

Knockout stage

Bracket

Quarterfinals

5–8th place bracket

5–8th place semifinals

Seventh place game

Fifth place game

Semifinals

Third place game

Final

Final ranking

Statistics and awards

Top goalscorers

Source: IHF

Top goalkeepers

Source: IHF

All-Star Team
The all-star team was announced on 10 August 2022.

Notes

References

2022 Women's Youth World Handball Championship
2022
Women's Youth World Handball Championship
Women's Youth World Handball Championship
Youth World Handball Championship
Sports events affected by the 2022 Russian invasion of Ukraine
Sports competitions in Skopje